Argentina–Serbia relations refers to the diplomatic relations between Argentina and Serbia. Both nations were founding members of the Group of 77 and the United Nations.

History
In 1870, the first registered Serbian migrants arrived and settled in Argentina. In 1914, is estimated that over 38,000 Serbians had immigrated to Argentina since the arrival of the first migrants. 
In 1928, Argentina and Serbia established diplomatic relation. In 1918, Serbia became an integral part of Yugoslavia until its dissolution in 1992.

Argentine position on Kosovo
In 2008, after Kosovo  declared independence as a Republic of Kosovo, Argentine Foreign Minister Jorge Taiana said "if we were to recognise Kosovo, which has declared its independence unilaterally, without an agreement with Serbia, we would set a dangerous precedent that would seriously threaten our chances of a political settlement in the case of the Falkland Islands". Argentina will not recognize also because it "supports the principle of territorial integrity". Additionally, he stressed that the 1999 UN Resolution 1244 called for the mutual agreement of all parties to solve the dispute. He said that President Cristina Fernández de Kirchner would not give any official statement on the issue, reiterating that there would be no recognition of Kosovo.

Visits
On April 14, 2008 Serbian Minister of Foreign Affairs Vuk Jeremić visited Argentina, and agreed with Argentine Foreign Minister Jorge Taiana, on a series of joint steps within international multilateral institutions related to Serbia's diplomatic approach to Kosovo. Argentina will support the initiative of Serbia within the UN General Assembly to ask the opinion of the International Court of Justice on the legality of recognising Kosovo's unilateral independence and will actively advocate that this initiative is supported by Latin America countries and within the Non-Aligned Movement and Mercosur. During the visit it was agreed that Taiana will visit Belgrade in June and President Cristina Fernández de Kirchner in 2009.

Bilateral treaties

Resident diplomatic missions
 Argentina has an embassy in Belgrade.
 Serbia has an embassy in Buenos Aires.

See also 
 Argentines of Serb descent
 Argentina–Kosovo relations

References 

 

 
Bilateral relations of Serbia
Serbia